Below are the results of the Men's Super G World Cup 1989/1990 competition.

Calendar

Final point standings
In Men's Super G World Cup 1989/90 all results count.

Men's Super G Team Results
bold indicate highest score - italics indicate race wins

References 

World Cup
FIS Alpine Ski World Cup men's Super-G discipline titles